Djedptahiufankh (c. 969 – c. 935 BCE) served as Second Prophet of Amun and Third Prophet of Amun during the reign of Shoshenq I of the 22nd Dynasty.

Family and career
Djedptahiufankh is only known from his burial and mummy. He held the title of District Governor as well as "King's Son of Ramesses" and "King's Son of the Lord of the Two Lands". The latter may suggest that he was related to the royal family of possibly the 21st Dynasty or 22nd Dynasty.
It has been conjectured that Djedptahiufankh was the husband of Nesitanebetashru (A) (who was a daughter of Pinedjem II and Neskhons). This theory is based purely on the fact that Djedptahiufankh was buried next to Nesitanebetashru in DB320.

Death and burial
He died around the middle of Shoshenq I's reign according to inscriptions found written on the bandages of his mummy and coffin. He was buried in Deir El-Bahari Tomb 320 or DB320, which actually served as the family tomb of the 21st Dynasty High Priest of Amun Pinedjem I. DB320 was discovered in the 19th century and quickly became famous for containing a cache of many of the most significant New Kingdom royal mummies including the mortal remains of Amenhotep I, the Great Ramesses II, Ramesses III, Ramesses IX, and Thutmose I, Thutmose II and Thutmose III.

Three separate mummy bandages dating to Years 5, 10 and 11 of Shoshenq I were found on Djedptahiufankh's body. Djedptahiufankh's burial was found intact and undisturbed, and his mummy was unwrapped by Gaston Maspero in 1886. A web link below gives a clear photo of his mummy and a discussion of his career. It also mentions some of the jewelry, in the form of gold rings, amulets and a uraeus, among other items, which were found on his body.

References

External links
Profile of Djedptahiufankh

Prophets of Amun
People of the Twenty-second Dynasty of Egypt
Ancient Egyptian mummies